A stun grenade, also known as a flash grenade, flashbang, thunderflash, or sound bomb, is a less-lethal explosive device used to temporarily disorient an enemy's senses. Upon detonation, they produce a blinding flash of light and an extremely loud "bang". They are often used in close-quarters combat, door breaching, and riot control, typically to stun enemies or distract them.

Stun grenades were first used by the British Army Special Air Service's counterterrorist wing in the late 1970s, and have been used by police and military forces worldwide since.

Despite their less-lethal nature, stun grenades are still capable of causing harm, and can injure or kill when detonating in close proximity. They are also capable of sparking fires.

Effects 
Stun grenades are designed to produce a blinding flash of light of around 7 megacandela (Mcd) and an intensely loud "bang" of greater than 170 decibels (dB).

The flash temporarily activates all photoreceptor cells in the eye, blinding it for approximately five seconds. Afterward, victims perceive an afterimage which impairs their vision. The volume of the detonation also causes temporary deafness in the victim and disturbs the fluid in the ear, causing a loss of balance.

Construction 
Unlike a fragmentation grenade, stun grenades are constructed with a casing made to remain intact during detonation and avoiding fragmentation injuries, while having large circular cutouts to allow the light and sound of the explosion through. The filler consists of a pyrotechnic metal-oxidant mix of magnesium or aluminium and an oxidizer such as potassium perchlorate or potassium nitrate.

Hazards 
While stun grenades are designed to limit injury to their targets, permanent hearing loss has been reported. Other injuries and deaths have also been caused by their use, usually when a grenade detonated close to a person, or due to structure fires caused by detonation.

The concussive blast still has the ability to cause injuries, and the heat created may ignite flammable materials. The fires that occurred during the 1980 Iranian Embassy siege in London were caused by stun grenades coming into contact with flammable objects.

See also
 Blast ball
 Dazzler
 M84 stun grenade

References

External links 

 FM 3-23.30 Grenades and Pyrotechnic Signals. GlobalSecurity.org, 1 September 2000. Ch. 1, Sec. 10. "Stun Hand Grenades". Retrieved on 26 May 2011.

 
British inventions